In mathematics, the multiple zeta functions are generalizations of the Riemann zeta function, defined by

and converge when Re(s1) + ... + Re(si) > i for all i. Like the Riemann zeta function, the multiple zeta functions can be analytically continued to be meromorphic functions (see, for example, Zhao  (1999)). When s1, ..., sk are all positive integers (with s1 > 1) these sums are often called multiple zeta values (MZVs) or Euler sums. These values can also be regarded as special values of the multiple polylogarithms.

The k in the above definition is named the "depth" of a MZV, and the n = s1 + ... + sk is known as the "weight".

The standard shorthand for writing multiple zeta functions is to place repeating strings of the argument within braces and use a superscript to indicate the number of repetitions. For example,

Definition 
Multiple zeta functions arise as special cases of the multiple polylogarithms

which are generalizations of the polylogarithm functions. In particular, when , they are called Euler sums or alternating multiple zeta values, and when  they are simply called multiple zeta values. Multiple zeta values are often written

and Euler sums are written

where .

.

Integral structure and identities 
It was noticed by Kontsevich that it is possible to express colored multiple zeta values (and thus their special cases) as certain multivariable integrals. This result is often stated with the use of a convention for iterated integrals, wherein 

Using this convention, the result can be stated as follows:

This result is extremely useful due to a well-known result regarding products of iterated integrals, namely that 

 for any , 

which, by the aforementioned integral identity, makes 

Then, the integral identity on products gives

Two parameters case

In the particular case of only two parameters we have (with s > 1 and n, m integers):

 where  are the generalized harmonic numbers.

Multiple zeta functions are known to satisfy what is known as MZV duality, the simplest case of which is the famous identity of Euler:

where Hn are the harmonic numbers.

Special values of double zeta functions, with s > 0 and even, t > 1 and odd, but s+t = 2N+1 (taking if necessary ζ(0) = 0):

Note that if  we have  irreducibles, i.e. these MZVs cannot be written as function of  only.

Three parameters case

In the particular case of only three parameters we have (with a > 1 and n, j, i integers):

Euler reflection formula
The above MZVs satisfy the Euler reflection formula:
 for 

Using the shuffle relations, it is easy to prove that:

 for 

This function can be seen as a generalization of the reflection formulas.

Symmetric sums in terms of the zeta function

Let , and for a partition  of the set , let .

 and

Theorem 1 (Hoffman)
For any real , .

Proof. (There is no loss of generality, since we can take limits.) The left-hand side can be written as
. Now thinking on the symmetric

group  as acting on k-tuple  of positive integers. A given k-tuple  has an isotropy group

 and an associated partition  of :  is the set of equivalence classes of the relation 
Now the term  occurs on the left-hand side of  exactly  times. It occurs on the right-hand side in those terms corresponding to partitions  that are refinements of : letting  denote refinement,  occurs  times. Thus, the conclusion will follow if 
 for any k-tuple  and associated partition .
To see this, note that  counts the permutations having cycle type specified by : since any elements of  has a unique cycle type specified by a partition that refines , the result follows.

For , the theorem says 
This is the main result of.

Having . For a partition

Theorem 2 (Hoffman)
For any real , .

Proof. We follow the same line of argument as in the preceding proof. The left-hand side is now
Thus, it suffices to show  
  (1)

But such an isotropy group has equal numbers of even and odd permutations unless it is trivial, i.e. unless the associated partition   is 
.

The sum and duality conjectures

We first state the sum conjecture, which is due to C. Moen.

Sum conjecture (Hoffman). For positive integers k and n,

Three remarks concerning this conjecture are in order. First, it implies
.

This was proved by Euler and has been rediscovered several times, in particular by Williams. Finally, C. Moen has proved the same conjecture for k=3 by lengthy but elementary arguments.
For the duality conjecture, we first define an involution  on the set  of finite sequences of positive integers whose first element is greater than 1.
 and 

For example,

Duality conjecture (Hoffman).

This sum conjecture is also known as Sum Theorem, and it may be expressed as follows: the Riemann zeta value of an integer n ≥ 2 is equal to the sum of all the valid (i.e. with s1 > 1) MZVs of the partitions of length k and weight n, with 1 ≤ k ≤ n − 1. In formula:

For example with length k = 2 and weight n = 7:

Euler sum with all possible alternations of sign
The Euler sum with alternations of sign appears in studies of the non-alternating Euler sum.

Notation
  with 

 with 
 with 

As a variant of the Dirichlet eta function we define
 with

Reflection formula
The reflection formula  can be generalized as follows:

if  we have

Other relations
Using the series definition it is easy to prove:
 with 
 with 
A further useful relation is: 

where  and 

Note that  must be used for all value  for which the argument of the factorials is

Other results

For all positive integers :

 or more generally:

Mordell–Tornheim zeta values

It is a special case of the Shintani zeta function.

References

Notes

External links
 

Zeta and L-functions